The Ultimate Collection is a compilation album by American band Earth, Wind & Fire released in July 1999 on Columbia Records. The album reached No. 34 upon the UK Albums Chart.

Singles
The album cut "September '99" reached No. 1 on the RPM Canadian Dance Songs chart, No. 4 on the UK Dance Singles chart and No. 25 on the UK Pop Singles chart.

Critical reception

With a 5 out of 5 stars rating Kit Aiken of Uncut called the album "near perfect" and "invaluable". 
Andy Kellman of AllMusic gave a 3.5 out of 5 stars rating and noted "A truly "ultimate" Earth, Wind & Fire compilation would offer a larger assortment of highlights from the band's catalog, but this is a decent one-disc/20-track overview." With a 4 out of 5 stars rating, Toby Manning of Mixmag wrote "Earthy, Fiery? No just elemental." Caroline Sullivan of The Guardian also gave a 5 out of 5 stars rating and declared "in fact, apart from ballads like 'That's the Way of the World', its hard to find a track on The Ultimate Collection that doesn't sparkle on the dance floor."

Track listing

Charts

References

1999 albums
1999 greatest hits albums
Earth, Wind & Fire albums
Earth, Wind & Fire compilation albums
Albums produced by Maurice White
Albums produced by Charles Stepney